

List of countries

References

South-Eastern Asia